Yogambara (Tibetan: nam khai nal jor), is a tutelary deity in Tibetan Buddhism belonging to the Wisdom-mother class of the Anuttarayoga Tantra.

Yogambara is mentioned in the Vajravali Buddhist tantra text by Abhayakaragupta and through the tradition of Marpa and Ngok Loden Sherab. 

Semi-wrathful in appearance, he is dark blue in colour, and has three faces, blue, white and red.

External links
 Yogambara at Himilayan art.org

Tibetan Buddhist deities
Tutelary deities